The 1964 Prairie View A&M Panthers football team was an American football team that represented Prairie View A&M University in the Southwestern Athletic Conference (SWAC) during the 1964 NCAA College Division football season. In their 16th season under head coach Billy Nicks, the Panthers compiled a perfect 9–0 record, won the SWAC championship, and outscored opponents by a total of 303 to 110.   

The Pittsburgh Courier selected Prairie View as the 1964 black college football national champion with a rating of 25.71, ahead of second-place  with a 24.14 rating and third-place Florida A&M with a 23.29 rating. Prairie View was also ranked No. 2 in the final Associated Press 1964 small college poll and No. 8 in the final United Press International poll.

At the end of the 1964 season, the Pittsburgh Courier selected Prairie View's Billy Nicks as the national Coach of the Year and quarterback Jimmy Kearney as the Back of the Year. Another key player was end Otis Taylor who later played 11 seasons for the Kansas City Chiefs.

Schedule

References

Prairie View AandM
Prairie View A&M Panthers football seasons
Black college football national champions
Southwestern Athletic Conference football champion seasons
College football undefeated seasons
Prairie View AandM Football